Amelia March Luckinbill (formerly Weatherly born March 17, 1973) is an American actress best known for her roles in American soap operas.

Early life
Amelia March Heinle was born in Phoenix, Arizona, and has four younger siblings. She grew up in Arizona and moved to New Jersey with her family when she was 15 years old.

Career
From 1993 to 1995, she played the role of Stephanie "Steffi" Brewster on the soap opera Loving. She also played the character for two months in that show's short-lived spin off The City from November 1995 until January 1996. In 1994, she was nominated for a Soap Opera Digest Award for "Outstanding Female Newcomer".

Through the 1990s, she appeared in many made for TV movies, as well as a role in the 1999 Steven Soderbergh film The Limey (as Peter Fonda's girlfriend). She appeared in the music video for "I Will Buy You a New Life" by Everclear.

In 2001, she returned to daytime television, this time in the role of Mia Saunders on All My Children, the heretofore unknown half-sister of Liza Colby (Marcy Walker).  lthough she started as a front-burner character, her romantic pairing with Jake Martin (J. Eddie Peck) didn't work out because of the actor's exit from the show, with Mia relegated to a background character. In 2004, Heinle opted not to renew her contract with All My Children and left the show.

On March 21, 2005, Heinle joined the cast of the CBS soap opera The Young and the Restless, as Victoria Newman, replacing the popular Heather Tom in the role. She won a Daytime Emmy Award for Outstanding Supporting Actress in a Drama Series in 2014 and again in 2015 for the role.

In April 2009, Heinle appeared in season 4, episode 20, of Ghost Whisperer, entitled "Stage Fright", with husband Thad Luckinbill and fellow daytime drama actress Lesli Kay.

Personal life
In February 1995, she married her Loving co-star and on-screen love interest, Michael Weatherly. On January 10, 1996, Heinle gave birth to their only child, a son named August. She and Weatherly divorced in 1997.

In March 2007, she married her Young and the Restless co-star, Thad Luckinbill, notable for portraying her onscreen ex-husband, J.T. Hellstrom.  Their first child together, a son, Thaddeus Rowe, was born on November 2, 2007. Their second child, a daughter, Georgia March, was born on December 17, 2009.Luckinbill filed for divorce from Heinle in 2017, but as of 2022 they are still together.

Filmography

Film

Television

Awards and nominations

References

External links 

 Amelia Heinle Interview

1973 births
Living people
American soap opera actresses
American television actresses
Actresses from Phoenix, Arizona
People from Casa Grande, Arizona
20th-century American actresses
21st-century American actresses
Daytime Emmy Award winners
Daytime Emmy Award for Outstanding Supporting Actress in a Drama Series winners